The Residences at Liberty National is an apartment complex concept in Jersey City, New Jersey, United States. The Residences at Liberty National consists of Towers I, II, and III. Tower I will have 35 floors, Tower II will have 43 floors, and Tower III will have 50 floors. Towers I, and II and III were originally scheduled for completion in 2009 however construction was placed on hold and remains halted.

See also
 List of tallest buildings in Jersey City

References
 
 
 

Skyscrapers in Jersey City, New Jersey
Proposed skyscrapers in the United States